990 Yerkes is a main belt asteroid discovered by Belgian-American astronomer George Van Biesbroeck in 1922, and named after the Yerkes Observatory.

Photometric observations of this asteroid collected during 2009 show a rotation period of 24.45 ± 0.05 hours with a brightness variation of 0.35 ± 0.05 magnitude.

References

External links 
 
 

000990
Discoveries by George Van Biesbroeck
Named minor planets
19221123